Pelham High School is a public high school located in Pelham, Georgia, United States. The school serves grades 9–12 in the Pelham City School District.

The school colors are navy blue, white, and gold. The school mascot is the Hornet.

Athletics
 Baseball
 Softball (girls')
 Basketball (boys' and girls')
 The Lady Hornets basketball team has won four state championships.
 Cross country
 Football
 Golf
 Tennis
 Track and field
 The PHS track team won the 2010 Class A Boys' State Championship. 
 Wrestling
 Cheerleading

References

External links
 Pelham High School

Public high schools in Georgia (U.S. state)
Schools in Mitchell County, Georgia